The list of ship launches in 1778 includes a chronological list of some ships launched in 1778.


References

1778
Ship launches